The Footwork FA16 was a Formula One car designed by Alan Jenkins and used by the Footwork team in the 1995 Formula One World Championship. The car was powered by a Hart 3-litre V8 engine and ran on Goodyear tyres. It was driven initially by Italian Gianni Morbidelli, who was in his second season with the team, and Japanese pay-driver Taki Inoue. Another Italian, Max Papis, replaced Morbidelli in mid-season due to the team's financial problems.

Development
The FA16 was a developed version of the FA15. It proved to be initially quite competitive, but the team lacked the budget to carry out testing and development. The chassis was not the weak link, but the Hart engine was down on power and unreliable.

Racing history 
Until the final race of the season, it seemed that Morbidelli's point in Canada would not be added to, but a high rate of attrition led to the Italian taking his first podium finish. This was a real morale-booster, especially after being replaced by the inexperienced Papis for seven Grands Prix.

Papis was still generally quicker than Inoue, who is largely remembered mostly for his two incidents with official course cars more than his tardy driving. At Monaco, his car was being towed back to the pits after practice has ended, when it was struck by the official course car at a speed high enough to flip it over. Inoue was still in the car with no seat belt on, and was thrown out by the accident. He was still wearing his helmet, saving him from serious injury, and he took part in the race.

At the Hungaroring, Inoue himself was hit by the course car. His FA16 had suffered an engine failure, and Inoue's rush to get a fire extinguisher resulted in him straying into the path of the approaching car, which hit him hard enough to knock him over. Again, he was not seriously hurt.

The team eventually finished eighth in the Constructors' Championship, with five points. Morbidelli's podium ensured that they were classified ahead of Tyrrell, who scored the same number of points.

The FA16 was replaced for the  season by the Footwork FA17.

Complete Formula One results
(key)

References

External links

1995 Formula One season cars
Arrows Formula One cars